is a Japanese film distributor. Some of their adult anime productions were released under their  label.

Films and anime produced and distributed
Films
Nagai Go no Horror Gekijo: Mannequin: Distribution
Nagai Go no Horror Gekijo: Kirikagami: Distribution
Chaos: Distribution
Oira Sukeban: Kessen! Pansutō: Distribution
Anime
Dragon Knight Gaiden: Production
Seikon no Qwaser: Production
Tama & Friends: Distribution
Black Jack: Distribution
Hi-sCoool! SeHa Girls: Distribution
Sonic the Hedgehog: Distribution
Voltage Fighter Gowcaizer: Distribution
Anime (as Cherry Lips)
Legend of the Wolf Woman: Production
One: True Stories: Production
Slave Nurses: Production

External links
Odessa official website
Cherry Lips
Cherry Lips' official website 

Film production companies of Japan
Anime companies
Hentai companies